John Henry Marsh (born 31 May 1948) is an English former footballer who played for Stoke City. He played as a right back.

Marsh began his career with his local club Stoke City making his debut in 1967. He soon became a member of Tony Waddington's first team in the 1970s as Stoke enjoyed their most successful period in their history. March played in the 1972 Football League Cup Final as Stoke beat Chelsea 2–1 to claim their first major honour. He also played for the club the UEFA Cup. In total Marsh made 440 appearances for Stoke in 12 seasons he spent at the Victoria Ground.

Career
Marsh was born in Stoke-on-Trent and was a star performer in the youth teams at Stoke City. A boyhood Stoke fan Marsh realised his dream making his debut against Arsenal on the opening day of the 1967–68. He made the right back position his own the following season making 30 appearances. Marsh was a combative right-back who had good control and a fair turn of speed for a small chunky player. He specialised in hard low crosses into the box which allowed forwards to flick on to others or volley towards goal. Jimmy Greenhoff recalls: "Jackie was so skilful, I am sure if he had played for Manchester United he would have played for England. He was a defender who played like a midfielder." He played 47 times in 1970–71 as Stoke reached the semi-final of the FA Cup losing out to Arsenal. He then played in 69 matches during the hectic 1971–72 season which saw Stoke again lose to Arsenal at the semi-final stage but they did beat Chelsea 2–1 in the 1972 League Cup final earning the "Potters" their first major trophy.

He remained a solid and consistent performer for Stoke at right-back under Tony Waddington throughout the 1970s. In January 1976 a severe storm in Stoke-on-Trent saw the Victoria Ground badly damaged and as a result the club had to sell their players to fund the repair costs. Marsh resisted any move away but a threadbare squad suffered relegation 1976–77. They gained a quick return to the top tier in 1978–79. Marsh was given a free transfer in the summer of 1979 and he went on to play for Los Angeles Aztecs and joined Terry Conroy in Hong Kong with Bulova SA. He returned to England to play for non-league Northwich Victoria.

Career statistics
Source:

Honours
 Stoke City
 Football League Cup: 1972
 Football League Second Division third-place promotion: 1978–79

References

External links
 Jackie Marsh at StokeCityFC.com 
 
 John Marsh - North America League stats

1948 births
Living people
Footballers from Stoke-on-Trent
English footballers
Association football fullbacks
Stoke City F.C. players
English Football League players
Los Angeles Aztecs players
Northwich Victoria F.C. players
North American Soccer League (1968–1984) players
English expatriate sportspeople in the United States
Expatriate soccer players in the United States
English expatriate footballers